VLAB (Venture Lab) is Silicon Valley non-profit organization dedicated to connecting  entrepreneurs, experts, venture capitalists, private investors and engineers.

History
VLAB was founded in November 1990 as entrepreneurship forum. VLAB is one of 28 worldwide chapters of the MIT Enterprise Forum, Inc and is sponsored by the Stanford University Office of Technology Licensing, and the Alumni Association of Stanford's Graduate School of Business.

Past VLAB events participants have included CEOs and senior level executives from companies such as Tesla Motors, Google, Tellme, Mint, Cloudera, and LinkedIn. Other participants have included venture capital firms such as Draper Fisher Jurvetson, Sequoia, Mayfield, USVP, Hummer Winblad Venture Partners, and New Enterprise Associates.

References

External links
 VLAB Website

Massachusetts Institute of Technology
Non-profit organizations based in California